The Storehouse No. 2 is a historic warehouse located in the Sunset Park neighborhood of Brooklyn, New York. It was a building in the United States Navy Fleet supply base that was built during World War I. It was built in 1917 by Turner Construction, and is an eight-story, reinforced concrete building in the Classical Revival style.  The building measures 700 feet by 200 feet and occupies the entire block bounded by Second and Third avenues and 30th and 31st streets.

It was listed on the National Register of Historic Places in 2013.

References

Sunset Park, Brooklyn
Buildings of the United States Navy
Industrial buildings and structures on the National Register of Historic Places in New York City
Industrial buildings completed in 1917
Neoclassical architecture in New York City
National Register of Historic Places in Brooklyn
Brooklyn Navy Yard
1917 establishments in New York City

Closed installations of the United States Navy
Installations of the United States Navy in New York City